Gehwara-e-Adab [Nursery of Literature] is an International Literary Organization that was formed to support and promote the Urdu Language and its rich literature in the world. Currently it is working in Pakistan, the United States, and Canada.

Gehwara-e-Adab was founded in Karachi on 1989 by a group of students from University of Karachi, with the aim to highlight the feature and importance of Urdu. Team Gehwara-e-Adab is committed to promote Urdu literature and poetry to enhance Urdu culture.

It has continuously conducted several programs include Urdu Debate Competition, Urdu Speech Competition, Urdu essay competition and Urdu Mushairah (Poetry recitation).

Publication 
Gehwara-e-Adab frequently publishes many magazines, books and booklets on different occasions. It also publishes some magazines with collaboration with difference student's societies.

NAQEEB 
NAQEEB is a quarterly Urdu magazine featuring articles, reports, poetry and other materials of interest to students. It is published by Gehwara-e-Adab in collaboration with APMSO from the head-office of Gehwara-e-Adab.

NAQEEB means “Harbinger” and it is quite popular among students of Karachi.

FIKR-E-NOU 
Fikr-e-Nou is monthly Urdu magazine which is issued from University of Karachi. This magazine was published in collaboration with KUrian's Student Society. It features articles of students of Karachi University and raises their issues. It also plays a significant role in raising students’ issues to the authorities of campus.

WEEKLY NAQEEB Newspaper 
It is the only newspaper publishes by Gehwara-e-Adab on every week. It is featuring educational news from different educational institutes of Karachi. The most popular section of the newspaper is Urdu Poetry's section and Urdu Fiction Novel's section.

Gehwara-e-Adab is also publishing many other materials.

MUSHAIRAH (Poetry Recitation) 
Gehwara-e-Adab is well known for organizing grand Urdu Mushairahs (Poetry recitation). It first organized Pak-o-Hind Dosti Mushairah in Karachi to promote peace between Pakistan and India. In this event almost 14 poets came from India on the invitation of team Gehwara-e-Adab. Now Pak-o-Hind Dosti Mushairah is frequently organized along in United States and Canada.

Pak-o-hind dosti mushairah 
On Saturday, 16 April 2005, Gehwara-e-Adab organized Pak-o-India Dosti (Friendship) Mushairah in Lal Qila Ground, azizabad.

Many well-known poets from both sides Pakistan and India includes Majid Khalil, Mohsin Bhopali (late), Iftikhar Arif, Manzar Bhopali, Athar Shah Khan, Gulnar Afreen, Khuwaja Rafiq Anjum, Khushbir Singh Shaad, Pirzada Qasim, Pervaiz Roshan, Anwar Bari, Aqil Barelvi, Mumtaz Nasim, Saleem Kausar, Afzal Manglori, Mohsin Changazi, Ahmed Naveed, Suman Dobey, Adil Lakhnavi and many others present their poetries in this Mushairah.

In this event governor Sindh Dr. Eshrat-ul-Ebad also present their poetries to the audience.

AALMI MUSHAIRAH (In the memories of Mohsin Bhopali) 
Gehwara-e-Adab organized a grand poetry recitation by named  in Lal Qila Ground, Aziz Abad. This event was attended by a large number of citizens of Karachi and especially students.

Many political, sports, entertainment and educational personalities also attend the event and appreciate the event.

Gehwara-e-adab (usa) 
Many former members of Gehwara-e-Adab shift to USA. They found that Gehwara-e-Adab's activities is quite popular in Indian and Pakistani communities in USA and that's encourage the team Gehwara-e-Adab for formed a chapter of Gehwara-e-Adab outside Pakistan and then in 2003 Gehwara-e-Adab established its USA chapter under the name of “Gehwara-e-Adab (USA)”. Gehwara-e-Adab (USA) also organizing many international and domestic events.

The current head of Gehwara-e-Adab is Prof. Masroor Qureshi. Qureshi was a professor in Federal Urdu Science University, Karachi.

PAK-O-HIND Yom-e-Azadi Mushairah 
On August 20, 2008, Gehwara-E-Adab (USA) arranged a poetry recitation in Chicago, USA. This event named Pak-O-Hind Youm-E-Azadi Mushairah. This is enjoyed and welcome by Pakistani and Indian communities.

Mr. Niaz Gulburgvi was (President) of this Mushairah and Special guest was Mr. Jazib Qureshi. Many known poets present their poetry.

The key participant poets are Mr. Jazib Qureshi, Mr. Niaz Gulbergvi, Mr. Syed Qaisar Ali, Mr. Serwat Zohra, Mr. Hamid Amrohi, Mr. Mehboob Ali Khan, Mr. Rasheed Sheikh, Mr. Khursheed Khizar, Ms. Seema Abdi, Mr. Wajid Nadeem, Mr. Mohammad Salim, Mr. Ms. Naseema Kulsoom, Mr. Rohail Khan, Mr. Hashmat Sohail, Mr. Abid Ullah Ghazi and Dr. Abdul Waheed Fakhri.

GEHWARA-E-ADAB (Canada) 
Founding of Gehwara-e-Adab (Canada) is also similar to Gehwara-e-Adab (USA). The former members of Gehwara-e-Adab moved to Canada and then in 2008 Gehwara-e-Adab established its Canada chapter under the name of “Gehwara-e-Adab (Canada)”. Gehwara-e-Adab (Canada) frequently organized many events.

Urdu mushairah 
Gehwara-e-Adab (Canada) is organized by an Urdu Mushairah on May 5, 2012 at Port Credit School Auditorium, Ontario, Canada.

In the event many renowned poets from Canada, Pakistan, India and rest of world are presented their poetries in this event. Some of the prominent names are Iqbal Ashar, Manzar Bhopali, Prof. Waseem Barelvi, Dr. Wali Alam Shaheen, Dr. Taqi Abidi, Sataya Pal Annad, Ashfaq Hussain, Zakia Ghazal, Tasleem Elahi Zulfi and many more local poets.

Consulate General of Pakistan in Toronto Mr. Imran Ali attends and appreciates the event.

By far this was the biggest event in the history of Urdu Poetry in Toronto and Team members of Gehwara-e-Adab (Canada) did a great job to make it a success.

References 

Organisations based in Karachi
Poetry organizations
Urdu-language magazines
Urdu-language literature
Pakistani writers' organisations